The enzyme glucose-1-phospho-D-mannosylglycoprotein phosphodiesterase (EC 3.1.4.51)  catalyzes the reaction

6-(D-glucose-1-phospho)-D-mannosylglycoprotein + H2O  α-D-glucose 1-phosphate + D-mannosylglycoprotein

This enzyme belongs to the family of hydrolases, specifically those acting on phosphoric diester bonds.  The systematic name of this enzyme class is 6-(D-glucose-1-phospho)-D-mannosylglycoprotein glucose-1-phosphohydrolase. This enzyme is also called α-glucose-1-phosphate phosphodiesterase.

References

 

EC 3.1.4
Enzymes of unknown structure